The 1954 National League Division Two was the ninth post-war season of the second tier of motorcycle speedway in Great Britain.

Summary
The Southern League was replaced by the Southern Area League which resulted in Division Two taking in teams from the defunct Southern League. Only St Austell Gulls declined to step up to the national level, whilst from the previous season Yarmouth Bloaters were not issued a racing licence and Stoke Potters withdrew. Bristol Bulldogs moved down from Division One to make 15 teams starting the season however Glasgow White City Tigers and Wolverhampton Wasps withdrew before the league campaign started.
 
Bristol Bulldogs won the title

Plymouth Devils withdrew after 1 league fixture, Edinburgh Monarchs withdrew after 5.

Final table

Glasgow White City Tigers, Wolverhampton Wasps withdrew before league racing
Plymouth Devils, Edinburgh Monarchs withdrew, record expunged.

Top Five Riders (League only)

See also
List of United Kingdom Speedway League Champions

References

Speedway National League Division Two
Speedway National League Division Two
1954 in speedway